Pablo García Fernández (born December 26, 1976 in Oviedo, Spain) is a guitarist, for the power metal band WarCry.

Career
Pablo's first contact with a guitar emerges at the age of 16, in the summer of 1993, on a self-taught, and decides to dedicate most of his time to that instrument. Leading him to form his first band with some friends. When everything becomes a little bit more serious he joins WarCry in 1996. Later he would become part of another local band Presto recording an EP "Disciples Of Fear" covering some Yngwie Malmsteen's songs in the salon Quatro De Avilés. During that time he attends to the Instituto de Música y Tecnología (IMT) in Madrid in the month of July where they mainly studied harmony. 

After Presto's separation he starts along with former components of Presto and WarCry a Progressive metal project named Relative Silence recording two albums, the first one was untitled and contained three specific tracks which included a version of Iron Maiden, and the second album was recorded between December 2001 and January 2002, entitled "Mixture?" with 4 tracks. 

In January 2001 Víctor and Alberto asked him to collaborate in their first studio album WarCry. After a while, he finally decides to become an active member of the band and leaves aside his participation in Relative Silence.

Over the years he has attended to several courses of Jazz by the pianist Joshua Edelman and the guitarists Chema Saiz and Joaquín Chacón. Combining his role in WarCry with another career "Guitar Professor". His biggest influences are Dream Theater, Symphony X, and guitarists like John Petrucci, Michael Romeo, Paul Gilbert, Steve Vai and Yngwie Malmsteen.

Discography

Presto

 Presto (EP) (1998)

Relative Silence
 Mixture? (2002)

WarCry
 WarCry (2002)
 El Sello De Los Tiempos (2002)
 Alea Jacta Est (2004)
 ¿Dónde Está La Luz? (2005)
 Directo A La Luz (2006)
 La Quinta Esencia (2006)
 Revolución (2008)
 Alfa (2011)
 Omega (2012)
 Inmortal (2013)

Personal information
 Name: Pablo García Fernández.
 Birthplace: Oviedo, Spain.
 Date Of Birth: December/26/1976.
 Instrument: Guitar.
 In WarCry: 1996 - 1997/2002–present.
 Influences: Dream Theater, John Petrucci, Symphony X, Michael Romeo, Racer X, Yngwie Malmsteen...
 Formations: WarCry, Relative Silence, Presto.
 First CD: Street Lethal - Racer X

Faves

 Band: Dream Theater.
 Drink: Coffee.
 Food: Scallops.
 Film: Dark City.
 Nonmusical Likings: To Be With The Family And Friends.
 Song Of WarCry: Señor.
 Song Of El Sello De Los Tiempos: Alejandro.
 Song Of Alea Jacta Est:  Reflejos De Sangre.
 Song Of ¿Dónde Está La Luz?: Tu Ausencia.
 Song Of Another Band: "Under a Glass Moon" - Dream Theater.
 Concert: Tour of Falling Into Infinity - Dream Theater (Madrid)

External links
WarCry's Official Website
Pablo García's Website

WarCry (band) members
Living people
Musicians from Asturias
People from Oviedo
1976 births